Myosin-Vb, a myosin V type protein, is encoded by the MYO5B gene in humans.

Recent evidence suggests that Myosin-Vb is related to the creation of memories by actin-dependent trafficking of AMPA receptor containing recycling endosomes in dendritic spines.

Mutations of MYO5B cause microvillus inclusion disease due to defective trafficking of apical and basolateral proteins.

MYO5B has also been associated with bipolar disorder.

Interactions 

MYO5B has been shown to interact with RAB11FIP2.

References

Further reading

External links 
  GeneTests/NIH/NCBI/UW information Diarrhea with Microvillus Atrophy 2 DIAR2 Microvillus Inclusion Disease MVID gene testing